Ecsenius shirleyae, known commonly as the Shirley's blenny in Indonesia, is a species of combtooth blenny in the genus Ecsenius It is found in the western Pacific ocean, specifically in Indonesia. It can reach a maximum length of 2.8 centimetres. The species was named in honour of Springer's wife, Shirley. It is considered most similar to its sister species E. bimaculatus.

References

External links
 

shirleyae
Fish described in 2004
Taxa named by Victor G. Springer
Taxa named by Gerald R. Allen